Cycas micholitzii is a species of cycad in Vietnam and Laos.

References

micholitzii
Flora of Vietnam
Flora of Laos